Korzhavino is a rural locality (a village) in Kovarditskoye Rural Settlement, Muromsky District, Vladimir Oblast, Russia. The population was 62 as of 2010. There are 7 streets.

Geography 
Korzhavino is located on the Ilevna River, 10 km west of Murom (the district's administrative centre) by road. Makarovka is the nearest rural locality.

References 

Rural localities in Muromsky District
Muromsky Uyezd